Hakan Binbaşgil (born 1960 in Istanbul, Turkey) is Executive Board Member and CEO at Akbank.

Career 
Hakan Binbaşgil has been the Board Member and CEO of Akbank since January 2012. Binbaşgil joined Akbank as the Executive Vice President in charge of Change Management in 2002. He initiated the Bank's "Restructuring Program" which transformed Akbank into one of Turkey's leading customer-focused, modern and innovative financial institutions. Hakan Binbaşgil was appointed Executive Vice President in charge of Retail Banking in 2003, and Deputy CEO in 2008.

Prior to joining Akbank, Binbaşgil worked as a Management Consultant in the London and İstanbul offices of Accenture, and as Executive Vice President at Pamukbank. Binbaşgil has also served on the boards of directors of numerous local and multinational companies in Turkey and abroad, and chaired various companies including Akbank AG, Aklease, AkAsset Management, AkInvestment, Akbank Dubai, and the Credit Bureau of Turkey.

In 2014, Binbaşgil was named on the CNBC Next List as being among the next generation of global trailblazers, who will be instrumental in reshaping all facets of society over the next 25 years.

Education 
After graduating from Robert College, Hakan Binbaşgil graduated from Boğaziçi University’s Faculty of Mechanical Engineering. Binbaşgil also holds MBA and MS degrees in Finance from Louisiana State University, USA.

Memberships 
He is a member of IIEB (Institut International D'Etudes Bancaires), the Emerging Markets Advisory Council of the IIF (Institute of International Finance), and TÜSİAD, Turkish Industry and Business Association.

Personal life 
Hakan Binbaşgil is an avid jazz piano player. He was named "Musician Businessman of the Year" in 2012 by Vodafone Turkey.

References 

1960 births
Robert College alumni
Living people
Turkish businesspeople